The Ohio Board of Regents was created in 1963 by the Ohio General Assembly to: provide higher education policy advice to the Governor of Ohio and the Ohio General Assembly; develop a strategy involving Ohio's public and independent colleges and universities; advocate for and manage state funds for public colleges; and coordinate and implement state higher education policies. In 2015 the Ohio General Assembly renamed the office of the Board of Regents as the "Department of Higher Education."

The board consists of nine members, in addition to two ex-officio representatives from the state legislature. The nine regents are not compensated and are appointed by the Governor to nine-year terms of service. The Governor appoints the chancellor who leads a professional staff in the service of higher education.

The Ohio Technology Consortium (OH-TECH), created in 2011 as the technology and information division of the Ohio Department of Higher Education, comprises the Ohio Supercomputer Center (OSC), the Ohio Academic Resources Network (OARnet), and the Ohio Library Information Network (OhioLINK).

References

External links
 Ohio Higher Ed The Ohio Board of Regents' official website

Education in Ohio
Governing bodies of universities and colleges in the United States